Dead Island is an action role-playing survival horror video game series published by Deep Silver for Microsoft Windows, PlayStation 3, Xbox 360 and mobile platforms iOS and Android. There are three installments in the series, with a fourth scheduled to be released on  April 21, 2023. Dead Island is centered on the challenge of surviving a zombie-infested open world island with a major emphasis on melee combat.

Dead Island was originally announced at E3 2006, but was pushed back to 2011. It was initially released on September 6 in North America, September 9 in PAL regions, and October 20 in Japan. A stand-alone expansion, Dead Island: Riptide, was released in 2013 while a sequel, Dead Island 2, is in development.

A spin-off, Escape Dead Island, was released in 2014. A MOBA game based on the Dead Island series called Dead Island: Epidemic was cancelled during the open beta phase in 2015. The free-to-play title had been available on Steam early access since May 2014, but eventually never saw a full release and was completely shut down.

Dead Island: Survivors, a mobile platform-based game, was launched on iOS and Android in July 2018.

Video games

Related media

Comic
A one-issue comic book version of the series was released by Marvel Comics. It begins with Roger Howard, an investigative journalist, as he looks into the illegal exploitation of Banoi Island's resources. He appeared in the game as a voice, leaving behind tape recordings.

The story begins just as Roger Howard arrives. He explains why he's at the Royal Palms Resort, and then begins to target Kenneth Ballard the Royal Palms' manager. After gaining access to his office, Roger finds detailed files on Xian Mei, Purna, Logan Carter, and Sam B. After going through the files, Roger hears a knock on the door. Before opening it, he tries to explain that he was looking for the bathroom. Unfortunately, after opening the door, he comes face-to-face with a zombie. The story suddenly ends, with Roger's fate unknown. In the video game, various audio logs of Roger are found, with him slowly going insane from being infected. When the survivors reach the prison, they find his last audio log, implying a prison guard had killed him once becoming infected, with the recording found next to (presumably) Roger's corpse.

The audio logs detail his journey. Revealing that he and a group of survivors tried to escape into the jungle, but had crashed. The driver and Roger were attacked by an infected Orangutan, with the driver dying and Roger escaping. Roger makes it to the prison, and states he's making this log for scientists to see the full symptoms of infection, but starts hallucinating about his son.

Film
On September 27, 2011, Lionsgate announced that they acquired rights to develop a film based on the game's announcement trailer. As its portrayal of a family desperately fighting for their lives provided artistic inspiration. The studio was reported to join with Occupant Entertainment (Producer Co.) and Deep Silver (Gaming Co.) with filming set to begin in 2015. As of 2022 no official update has been given.

Novel
A novel based on the events of the first game, and written by Mark Morris was released concurrently with Dead Island in 2011.

References

Horror mass media franchises
Video game franchises introduced in 2011
Embracer Group franchises
Techland games